Pursuant to Article 39 of the Law on Internal Regulations of the Islamic Consultative Assembly (Parliament of the Islamic Republic of Iran), the Joint Commission of the Islamic Consultative Assembly, in cases where a plan or bill is proposed in the Assembly and at the discretion of the board of directors is within the scope of work of several specialized commissions, is formed from the members of the relevant commissions to review the mentioned plan or bill. The number of members of the Joint Commission is 23, and the share of each of the relevant commissions is determined by the board of directors of the Assembly.

In the Joint Commission, one person is elected as the chairman and two as the vice-chairman, one as the informant and two as the secretary, all together as the board of the commission, by secret ballot with a relative majority of votes.

See also 
 Specialized Commissions of the Parliament of Iran
 Investigative Commission of the Islamic Consultative Assembly
 Special Commission of the Islamic Consultative Assembly
 Internal Regulation Commission of the Islamic Consultative Assembly
 Article 90 of the Constitution Commission of the Islamic Consultative Assembly
 Program, Budget and Accounting Commission of the Islamic Consultative Assembly
 Iranian Parliament Commission on Energy
 The history of the parliament in Iran

References

Committees of the Iranian Parliament
Islamic Consultative Assembly